The Allyn River Member is a geologic formation in the New England Orogen in eastern Australia. 

Seen in the Hunter River region near Dungog, this stratum is up to 1,000 metres thick, though 740 metres thick at its type locality. Formed in the Visean between 346.7 and 330.9 Ma., it is part of the Flagstaff Formation of sedimentary rocks.

This formation includes green to brown, medium thickly bedded lithic sandstone with turbiditic sedimentary structures and interbeds of brown thinly bedded mudstone.

See also 
 New England Orogen

References 

Geologic formations of Australia
Carboniferous System of Australia
Viséan
Sandstone formations
Turbidite deposits
Geology of New South Wales